The Sanderson–Clark Farmhouse is a historic farmstead at 47 Lincoln Street (aka 26 Lincoln Terrace) in Waltham, Massachusetts.  The property includes an 1831 Federal style house, along with farm-related outbuildings, including a barn and stable.  The property was used as a working farm until the early 20th century.  It is now surrounded by 20th-century infill development, although other Federal-era houses associated with the Sanderson family still stand nearby.

The house was listed on the National Register of Historic Places in 1989.

See also
National Register of Historic Places listings in Waltham, Massachusetts

References

Houses on the National Register of Historic Places in Waltham, Massachusetts
Federal architecture in Massachusetts
Houses completed in 1831
Houses in Waltham, Massachusetts